was a Japanese actor and voice actor. He began voice acting in the 1960s, landing small roles in Astroboy, and was the actor of choice for deep-voiced, serious males in the 1970s. He is most noted for his two longstanding roles, as the title character in Captain Harlock from 1978 through the 1980s and 1990s (Kōichi Yamadera of Neon Genesis Evangelion and Cowboy Bebop fame took over this role in 1998), and Goemon Ishikawa XIII of Lupin III from 1977 to 2011 (taking over from Chikao Ōtsuka, who played the role in 1971 and 1972). He was succeeded in the role of Goemon by Daisuke Namikawa.

Filmography

Television animation
1960s
Astro Boy (1963)
Big X (1964)
The Amazing 3 (1965)
Kimba the White Lion (1965)
Princess Knight (1967) (Prince Frank)
Sabu to Ichi Torimono Hikae (1968) (Sabu)
Star of the Giants (1968) (Mitsuru Hanagata)
1970s
Attack No. 1 (1970) (Mitamura)
Andersen Stories (1971) (Travelling Companion)
Wandering Sun (1971) (Fanny)
Devilman (1972) (Iwao Himura/Himmler)
Dokonjō Gaeru (1972) (Hanagata)
Babel II (1973) (Aoki)
Brave Raideen (1975) (Riki Jinguuji)
Candy Candy (1976) (William Albert Ardlay)
Gaiking (1976) (Peter Richardson)
Lupin III Part II (1977) (Goemon Ishikawa XIII)
Space Pirate Captain Harlock (1978) (Captain Harlock)
Space Carrier Blue Noah (1979) (Jrgens)
1980s
Honey Honey no Suteki na Bouken (1981) (Phoenix)
Arcadia of My Youth: Endless Orbit SSX (1982) (Captain Harlock)
Gyakuten! Ippatsuman (1982) (Minamoto no Yorimitsu)
Lupin III Part III (1984) (Goemon Ishikawa XIII)
Lupin III: Goodbye Lady Liberty (1989) (Goemon Ishikawa XIII)
1990s
Lupin III: Mystery of the Hemingway Papers! (1990) (Goemon Ishikawa XIII)
Lupin III: Steal Napoleon's Dictionary! (1991) (Goemon Ishikawa XIII)
Lupin III: From Russia With Love (1992) (Goemon Ishikawa XIII)
Lupin III: Voyage to Danger (1993) (Goemon Ishikawa XIII)
Lupin III: Dragon of Doom (1994) (Goemon Ishikawa XIII)
Lupin III: The Pursuit of Harimao's Treasure (1995) (Goemon Ishikawa XIII)
Lupin III: The Secret of Twilight Gemini (1996) (Goemon Ishikawa XIII)
Lupin III: Island of Assassins (1997) (Goemon Ishikawa XIII)
Lupin III: Crisis in Tokyo (1998) (Goemon Ishikawa XIII)
Lupin III: The Columbus Files (1999) (Goemon Ishikawa XIII)
2000s
Lupin III: Missed by a Dollar (2000) (Goemon Ishikawa XIII)
Lupin III: Alcatraz Connection (2001) (Goemon Ishikawa XIII)
Lupin III: Episode 0: First Contact (2002) (Goemon Ishikawa XIII)
Lupin III: Operation: Return the Treasure (2003) (Goemon Ishikawa XIII)
Lupin III: Stolen Lupin ~ The Copy Cat is a Midsummer's Butterfly~ (2004) (Goemon Ishikawa XIII)
Samurai Champloo (2004) (Mariya Enshirou)
Lupin III: An Angel's Tactics – Fragments of a Dream Are the Scent of Murder (2005) (Goemon Ishikawa XIII)
Lupin III: Seven Days Rhapsody (2006) (Goemon Ishikawa XIII)
Lupin III: Elusiveness of the Fog (2007) (Goemon Ishikawa XIII)
Lupin III: Sweet Lost Night ~Magic Lamp's Nightmare Premonition~ (2008) (Goemon Ishikawa XIII)
Lupin the 3rd vs. Detective Conan (2009) (Goemon Ishikawa XIII)
2010s
Lupin III: The Last Job (2010) (Goemon Ishikawa XIII)

OVA
Area 88 (Charlie)
Legend of the Galactic Heroes (1989) (Flottillenadmiral Ansbach)
Queen Emeraldas (1998) (Captain Harlock)
Lupin III: Return of the Magician (2002) (Goemon Ishikawa XIII)
Lupin III: Green Vs. Red (2008) (Goemon Ishikawa XIII)

Theatrical animation
Lupin III: Mystery of Mamo (1978) (Goemon Ishikawa XIII)
Lupin III: The Castle of Cagliostro (1979) (Goemon Ishikawa XIII)
Mobile Suit Gundam: Soldiers of Sorrow (1981) (Slegger Law)
Mobile Suit Gundam: Encounters in Space (1982) (Slegger Law)
Lupin III: Legend of the Gold of Babylon (1985) (Goemon Ishikawa XIII)
Toki no Tabibito -Time Stranger- (1986) (Toshito Kutajima)
Lupin III: Farewell to Nostradamus (1995) (Goemon Ishikawa XIII)
Lupin III: Dead or Alive (1996) (Goemon Ishikawa XIII)
Galaxy Express 999: Enternal Fantasy (1998) (Captain Harlock)
Fire Force DNA Sights 999.9 (1998) (Captain Harlock)

Video gamesZombie Revenge (1999) (Rikiya Busujima)Kessen II (2001) (Cao Cao) Kingdom Hearts Birth by Sleep (2010) (Master Eraqus)Kingdom Hearts III (2019) (Master Eraqus)Super Robot Wars T (2019) (Captain Harlock)

TokusatsuAkumaizer 3 (1975) (Zabitan)

DubbingFrankenstein Created Woman (1970 TV Asahi edition) (Anton (Peter Blythe))The Magnificent Seven (1974 TV Asahi edition) (Chico (Horst Buchholz))The Cassandra Crossing (Major Stark (John Phillip Law))The Great Escape (1971 Fuji TV edition) (Lt. Cmdr. Eric Ashley-Pitt (David McCallum))The Greatest Story Ever Told (Judas Iscariot (David McCallum))Help! (Paul McCartney)The Kiss of the Vampire (1970 TBS edition) (Carl Ravna (Barry Warren))The Shining'' (Jack Torrance (Jack Nicholson))

References

External links
Official agency profile 

1938 births
2019 deaths
Male voice actors from Yamanashi Prefecture
Japanese male video game actors
Japanese male voice actors
Aoni Production voice actors
20th-century Japanese male actors 
21st-century Japanese male actors
Lupin the Third